Allen is the given name of:

People

Lawyers, politicians and government officials
Allen Adams (1946–1990), Scottish politician
Allen Bristol Aylesworth (1854–1952), Canadian lawyer and politician
Allen H. Bagg (1867–1942), American politician
Allen E. Barrow (1914–1979), American judge
Allen S. Baker (1842–1916), American politician
Allen J. Bartunek (1928–1997), American politician
Allen C. Beach (1825–1918), American lawyer and politician, Secretary of State and Lieutenant Governor of New York
Allen Biehler, American Secretary of the Pennsylvania Department of Transportation from 2003 to 2011
Allen J. Bloomfield (1883–1932), American businessman and politician
Allen Boyd (born 1945), American politician
Allen Alexander Bradford (1815–1888), American delegate
Allen T. Brinsmade (1837–1913), American politician
Allen Brown (public servant) (1911–1999), Australian public servant
Allen Buansi, American politician
Allen R. Bushnell (1833–1909), American attorney and politician
Allen G. Campbell (1834–1902), American miner, politician, and philanthropist
Allen D. Candler (1834–1910), American politician, governor of Georgia
Allen T. Caperton (1810–1876), American and Confederate States politician
Allen M. Christensen (born 1946), American politician
Allen T. Compton (1938–2008), American judge
Allen Foster Cooper (1862–1917), American politician
Allen Turner Davidson (1819–1905), Confederate politician
Allen Dulles (1893–1969), American diplomat and lawyer, first civilian Director of Central Intelligence
Allen Craig Eiland (born 1962), American politician
Allen J. Ellender (1890–1972), American politician, senator from Louisiana
Allen Engel (born 1932), Canadian farmer and politician
Allen E. Ertel (born 1937), American politician
Allen V. Evans (born 1939), American politician
Allen J. Flannigan (1909–1965), American politician
Allen M. Fletcher (1853–1922), American politician, governor of Vermont
Allen C. Fuller (1822–1901), American politician
Allen J. Furlow (1890–1954), American politician and lawyer
Allen Thomson Gunnell (1848–1960), American lawyer, judge, and state legislator
Allen Hamiter (1867–1933), American politician
Allen Burroughs Hannay (1892–1983), American judge
Allen Jaggi (born 1944), American politician
Allen Johnson, leader in the Civil Rights Movement
Allen F. Johnson, American businessman and government official
Allen C. Kelley (1937–2017), American economist
Allen Kerr (born 1956), American politician and insurance agency owner
Allen T. Klots (1889–1965), American lawyer
Allen Kolstad (1931–2008), American farmer and politician
Allen Kukovich (born 1947), American politician
Allen P. Lovejoy (1825–1904), American lumber merchant and manufacturer and politician
Allen T. Lucas (1917–1973), American lawyer and politician
Allen S. Matthews (1845–1915), American merchant and politician
Allen G. Mitchell (1894–1953), American politician
Allen F. Moore (1869–1945), American politician
Allen B. Morse (1837–1921), American diplomat, jurist, and politician
Allen J. Oliver (1903–1953), American politician
Allen I. Olson (born 1938), American politician and attorney, former governor of North Dakota
Allen Ferdinand Owen (1816–1865), American legislator and lawyer
Allen Russell Patrick (1910–1995), Canadian politician
Allen Paul (politician) (born 1945), American politician
Allen J. Payton (1861–1917), American farmer and politician
Allen Potter (1818–1885), American politician
Allen Quist (born 1944), American politician
Allen Roach, Canadian politician elected to the Legislative Assembly of Prince Edward Island in 2011
Allen Rothenberg, American lawyer and President of COLPA
Allen F. Rush (1902–1980), American politician
Allen G. Rushlight (1874–1930), American politician, businessman, and plumber
Allen G. Schwartz (1934–2003), American judge
Allen D. Scott (1831–1897), American lawyer and politician
E. Allen Smith, Auditor General of Ceylon (1946–1953)
Allen Snyder (born 1946), American lawyer and politician
Allen E. Stebbins (1872–1941), American politician
Allen R. Sturtevant (1879–1966), American attorney and judge
Allen M. Thomas (born 1969), American politician
Allen C. Thompson (1906–1980), American politician
Allen G. Thurman (1813–1895), American politician, Ohio Supreme Court justice and vice presidential nominee
Allen W. Thurman (1847–1922), American politician
Allen Treadaway (born 1961), American politician
Allen T. Treadway (1867–1947), American politician
Allen Trimble (1783–1870), American politician
Allen Trovillion (1926–2020), American politician
Allen H. Turnage (1891–1971), American politician
Allen F. Warden (1852–1927), American newspaper editor and politician
Allen Weh (born 1942), American business executive, politician, and U.S. Marine colonel
Allen Wellons (born 1949), American attorney and politician
Allen West (born 1961), American politician and U.S. Army lieutenant colonel
Allen S. Whiting (1926–2018), American political scientist and government official
Allen T. Wikoff (1825–1902), American politician
Allen W. Wilder (1843–18??), American state legislator, teacher, and lawyer
Allen Williamson, member of the Oklahoma House of Representatives from 1966 to 1974
Allen C. Winsor (born 1976), American judge*Allen N. Yancy (1881–1941), Vice President of Liberia from 1928 to 1930
Allen Zoll, American political activist

In sports
Allen Aldridge (1944–2015), American football player
Allen Aldridge Jr. (born 1972), American retired National Football League player
Allen Aylett (born 1934), Australian football player
Allen Bailey (born 1989), American National Football League player
Allen Barbre (born 1984), American National Football League player
Allen Battle (born 1968), American baseball player
Allen W. Benson (1905–1999), American baseball pitcher
Allen Berg (born 1961), Canadian racing driver
Allen P. Berkstresser (1885–1956), American football and basketball coach and college athletic administrator
Allen Bradford (born 1988), American football player
Allen Brown (born 1943), American retired National Football League player
Allen Bryant (1918–1992), American baseball pitcher
Allen Carter (born 1952), American football player
Allen Chapman (born 1974), American soccer referee
Allen Chapman (born 1991), American football player
Allen Christensen (footballer) (born 1991), Australian rules footballer
Allen Coage (1943–2007), American professional wrestler and Olympic judo bronze medalist
Allen Conkwright (1896–1991), American baseball pitcher
Allen Córdoba (born 1995), Panamanian baseball player
Allen Crabbe (born 1992), American basketball player
Allen Craig (born 1984), American baseball player
Allen Crowe (1928–1963), American racing driver
Allen Cunningham (born 1977), American poker player
Allen Doyle (born 1948), American golfer
Allen Durham (born 1988), American basketball player
 Allen Elliott (1897–1979), American baseball player
Allen Flanigan (born 2001), American basketball player
 Allen Fox (born 1939), American tennis player and coach
 Allen Gavilanes (born 1999), American footballer
 Allen Green (born 1938), American football punter
 Allen Greene (born 1977), American athletic director
Allen Guevara (born 1989), Costa Rican footballer
Allen Harvin (born 1959), American football player
Allen Hopkins (pool player) (born 1951), American Hall-of-Fame pool player and color commentator
Allen Hopkins (soccer commentator), American sportscaster
Allen Hurns (born 1991), American National Football League player
Allen Iverson (born 1975), retired American basketball player
Allen Jacobs (1941–2014), American football player
Allen Jakovich (born 1968), retired Australian rules football player
Allen Jeardeau (1866–1900), American football and baseball coach
H. Allen Jerkens (1929–2015), American Thoroughbred race horse Hall of Fame trainer
Allen Johnson (born 1971), American hurdler
Allen Kelley (1932–2016), American basketball player
Allen Larue (born 1981), Seychelles footballer
Allen Lazard (born 1995), American football player
Allen Leavell (born 1957), American basketball player
Allen Levrault (born 1977), American baseball pitcher
Allen Lyday (born 1960), American football player
Allen Lynch (1938–2021), Australian footballer
Allen MacDonald (1896–19??), American football player
Allen May (born 1969), American racing driver
Allen McDill (born 1971), American baseball pitcher
Allen McDonough (1804–1888), Irish jockey
Allen Murphy (born 1952), American basketball player
Allen Nichols (1916–1981), American football player
Allen Njie (born 1999), Liberian footballer
Allen Nono (born 1992), Gabonese footballer
Allen Oliver (born 1924), English footballer
Allen Ong (born 1979), Malaysian swimmer
Allen Patrick (born 1984), American football player
Allen Pedersen (born 1965), Canadian ice hockey player
Allen Pitts (born 1964), retired Canadian Football League player
Allen Pinkett (born 1964), American football player
Allen Reisner (born 1988), American National Football League player
Allen Rice (born 1962), American football player
Allen Ripley (1952–2014), American baseball pitcher
Allen Robinson (born 1993), American football player
Allen Rosenberg (1931–2013), American rowing coxswain and coach
Allen Rossum (born 1975), American football player
Allen Russell (1893–1972), American baseball pitcher
Allen Snyder, American football player and football, basketball, and baseball coach
Allen Stack (1928–1999), American swimmer, 1948 Olympic champion
Allen Steck (born 1926), American mountaineer and rock climber
Allen Steckle (1872–1938), American football player and coach 
Allen Steen, American martial arts practitioner, teacher, and promoter 
Allen Tankard (born 1969), English footballer 
Allan Tolmich (1918–2012), American world record hurdler
Allen Trammell (born 1942), American football player
Allen Watson (born 1970), American baseball pitcher and coach
Allen Webster (born 1990), American baseball pitcher
Allen Yanes (born 1997), Guatemalan footballer
Allen York (born 1989), Canadian hockey goaltender
Allen H. Zikmund (1922–2018), American football player and coach

Scientists, engineers, and academics
Allen Abraham (1865–1922), Ceylon Tamil academic and astronomer
Allen V. Astin (1904–1984), American physicist
Allen Baker (1852–1918), Canadian-British engineer
Allen J. Bard (born 1933), American chemist and professor
Allen Bergin (born 1934), American clinical psychologist
Allen Boothroyd (1943–2020), British industrial designer
Allen Buchanan (born 1948), American philosopher
Allen G. Debus (1928–2009), American science historian
Allen F. Donovan (1914–1995), American aerospace engineer and systems engineer
Allen B. Downey (born 1967), American computer scientist
Allen B. DuMont (1901–1965), American electronics engineer, scientist and inventor
Allen Dyer, American psychiatrist and professor
Allen C. Eaves (born 1941), Canadian scientist
Allen Frances (born 1942), American psychiatrist
Allen James Fromherz (born 1980), American historian
Allen O. Gamble (1910–2001), American industrial psychologist
Allen J. Greenough (1905–1974), American engineer
Allen C. Guelzo (born 1953), American historian and professor
Allen Hatcher (born 1944), American topologist, professor and author
Allen Hawley (1893–1978), American fundraising administrator
Allen J. Hubin (born 1936), American historian and biographer
J. Allen Hynek (1910–1986), American astronomer, professor and ufologist
Allen Johnson (1870–1931), American historian, teacher, biographer, and editor
Allen Klein (born 1938), American gelotogist and author
Allen Lane (1902–1970), British publisher, founder of Penguin Books
Allen S. Lee, American researcher
Allen Lowrie (born 1948), Australian botanist
Allen Mawer (1879-1942), English philologist
Allen Meadors (born 1947), American professor and university administrator
Allen R. Miller (1942–2010), American mathematician
Allen J. Moore (born 1958), American researcher
Allen Newell (1927–1992), American researcher in computer science and cognitive psychology
Allen George Packwood, British archivist
Allen B. Rosenstein (1920–2018), American systems engineer
Allen J. Scott (born 1938), English geographer
Allen Sessoms (born 1946), American physicist, diplomat, and academic advisor
Allen Shenstone (1893–1980), Canandian physicist
Allen Shields (1927–1989), American mathematician
Allen C. Skorepa (1941–1998), American lichenologist
Allen Steere, American rheumatologist
Allen W. Trelease, American historian, professor
Allen Weiner, American legal academic
Allen B. Wilson (1823–1888), American inventor
Allen W. Wood (born 1942), American philosopher

In arts and entertainment
Allen Bickford, Australian actor
Allen Case (1934–1986), American actor
Allen Collins (1952–1990), one of the founding members, guitarist and songwriter for the Southern rock band Lynyrd Skynyrd
Allen Coulter, American television and film director
Allen Covert (born 1964), American comedian, actor, writer, and producer
Allen Curnow (1911–2001), New Zealand poet and journalist
Allen Danzinger (born 1942), American actor
Allen M. Davey (1894–1946), American cinematographer
Allen Daviau (born 1942), American cinematographer
Allen Drury (1918–1998), American novelist, writer of Advise and Consent, for which he won the Pulitzer Prize
Allen Edward Everitt (1824–1882), English architectural artist and illustrator
Allen Ginsberg (1926–1997), American poet and a leading figure of the Beat Generation and the counterculture
Allen Grubman, American entertainment lawyer
Allen Holubar (1890–1923), American actor, film director, and screenwriter
Allen Hulsey (born 1985), American singer, songwriter, guitarist, and visual artist
Allen Jones (born 1937), British pop artist
Allen Jones (1940–1987), American record producer and songwriter
Allen Neal Jones (born 1977), Known as AJ Styles, American professional wrestler
Allen Kim (born 1990), South Korean idol singer, actor, dancer, and television host
Allen Lanier (1946–2013), American musician, an original member of the rock band Blue Öyster Cult
Allen Leech (born 1981), Irish actor
Allen Ludden (1917–1981), American television personality, emcee and game show host
Allen Payne (born 1968), American actor
Allen M. Potter (1919–1995), American television soap opera producer
Allen Reynolds (born 1938), American record producer and songwriter
Allen Ritter (born 1988), American record producer, songwriter, singer, and pianist
Allen Rivkin (1903–1990), American screenwriter
Allen Ruppersberg (born 1944), American conceptual artist
Allen Saalburg (1899–1987), American painter, illustrator, and screen printer
Allen W. Seaby (1867–1953), English painter and printmaker
Allen Shearer (born 1943), American composer and baritone
Allen G. Siegler (1892–1960), American cinematographer
Allen Smith Jr. (1810–1890), American portrait painter
Allen Stone (born 1987), American musician
Allen Toussaint (1938–2015), American musician, songwriter, record producer
Allen Vizzutti (born 1952), American trumpeter, composer and music educator
Allen K. Wood (1898–1977), American assistant director and production manager
Douglas Allen Woody (1955–2000), bass guitarist of The Allman Brothers Band

In the military
Allen D. Beemer (1842–1909), American Civil War veteran and businessman
Allen Buchanan (1876–1940), U.S. Navy officer and Medal of Honor recipient
Allen M. Burdett Jr. (1921–1980), U.S. Army lieutenant general
Allen S. Cutts (1826–1896), American soldier
Allen J. Greer (1878–1964), US Army colonel and Medal of Honor recipient
Allen W. Gullion (1880–1946), U.S. Army officer
Allen Hobbs (1899–1960), captain in the U.S. Navy
Allen J. Jamerson (born 1961), U.S. Air Force officer
Allen Johnson (1829–1907), British Indian Army officer
Allen James Lynch (born 1945), U.S. Army soldier and Medal of Honor recipient
Allen K. Ono (1933–2016), U.S. Army lieutenant general
Allen T. Paredes (born 1965), Filipino Air Force general
Allen Lawrence Pope (born 1928), American military and paramilitary aviator
Allen B. Reed (1884–1965), U.S. Naval officer
Allen R. Schindler Jr. (1969–1992), U.S. Navy seaman murdered for being gay
Allen L. Seaman (1916–1944), U.S. Navy aviator
Allen H. Turnage (1891–1971), U.S. Marine Corps general
Allen Wheeler (1903–1984), English Royal Air Force officer and pilot
Allen B. Worley, 10th U.S. Merchant Marine Academy Superintendent

In religion
Allen James Babcock (1898–1969), American Roman Catholic bishop
Allen L. Bartlett (born 1929), American Episcopal priest
Allen W. Brown (1909–1990), bishop of the Episcopal Diocese of Albany, New York
Allen Francis Gardiner (1794–1851), British Royal Navy officer and missionary
Allen Johnston (1912–2002), American Anglican Archbishop of New Zealand and bishop
Allen J. Miller (1901–1991), 5th Bishop of Easton
Allen Secher (born 1935), American rabbi, civil and human rights activist, radio host, television producer, actor, author, and public speaker
Allen K. Shin, Korean-American bishop
Allen Henry Vigneron (born 1948), American Roman Catholic Archbishop of Detroit and bishop
Allen Yuan (1914–2005), Chinese Protestant Christian pastor

Writers and journalists
Allen Adler (1916–1964), American writer
Allen Barra, American journalist and author
Allen H. Greenfield, American occultist, UFOlogist, and author
Allen M. Hornblum, American author, journalist, criminal justice official, and political organizer
Allen Hunt (born 1964), American author, speaker, and pastor
Allen Paul (writer), American author, reporter and political speech writer
Allen Rucker (born 1945), American writer and author
Allen Say (born 1937), Japanese-American writer and illustrator
Allen Steele (born 1958), American journalist and science fiction writer
Allen Young (writer) (born 1941), American journalist, author, editor, publisher and social activist

Unclassifiable or other
Allen Apsley (disambiguation)
Allen Chao (born 1944), Taiwanese-American businessman
Allen Aaron Cook (1832–1899), American architect
Allen Edwards (disambiguation)
Allen Frantzen (born 1947 or 1948), American medievalist
Allen H. Greenfield (born 1946), American occultist, writer and bishop of the Gnostic Catholic Church
Allen Hobbs (1899–1960), American hydrographer, US Navy officer and governor of American Samoa
Allen Johnson (disambiguation)
Allen Jones (disambiguation)
Allen B. Kanavel (1874–1938), American surgeon
Allen V. Kneese (1930–2001), American pioneer
Allen Lewis (disambiguation)
Allen Lloyd (born 1949), British businessman, founder of LloydsPharmacy
Allen McClure (1935–2007), American sailor
Allen Miller (disambiguation)
Allen B. Morgan Jr., American businessman
Allen Morris (disambiguation)
Allen Paulson (1922–2000), American businessman and horse breeder
Allen Questrom (born 1941), American businessman
Allen Rosenberg (disambiguation)
Allen Rosenshine (born 1939), American advertising executive
Allen Snyder (disambiguation)
Allen Stanford (born 1950), American former financier convicted of fraud
Allen Thompson (disambiguation)
Allen Weisselberg (born 1947), American businessman
Allen West (disambiguation)
Allen Whipple (1881–1963), American surgeon
Allen Young (1827–1915), English master mariner and explorer

Fictional characters
Allen (The Walking Dead), in The Walking Dead comic book series and television series
Allen the Alien, an Image Comics character
Allen Adam, alter ego of the DC Comics superhero Captain Atom
Allen Walker, the protagonist in the D.Gray-man manga and anime series

See also
Alan (given name)
List of people with given name Alan
Allan (name), given name and surname

English masculine given names